Remigius Ritzler, O.F.M. Conv. (25 September 1909 – 2 December 1993) was a German Roman Catholic priest who continued the work on the Hierarchia Catholica Medii Aevi begun by Konrad Eubel (1842–1923), a compilation of all the cardinals and the bishops of the Latin Church since 1198 organized according to diocese or titular church.

References 

20th-century German Roman Catholic priests
1909 births
1993 deaths